The Minister of Foreign Affairs is the head of the Ministry of Foreign Affairs and a member of the Cabinet and the Council of Ministers. The incumbent minister is Wopke Hoekstra of the Christian Democratic Appeal (CDA) who has been in office since 10 January 2022. Regularly a State Secretary is assigned to the Ministry who is tasked with specific portfolios, currently the function is not in use. Additionally since 1965 there has been a Minister without Portfolio assigned to the Ministry, the Minister for Foreign Trade and Development Cooperation has traditionally Development Cooperation as portfolio, since 2012 the portfolio of Trade and Export has been assigned added to the function. The current Minister for Foreign Trade and Development Cooperation is Liesje Schreinemacher of the People's Party for Freedom and Democracy (VVD) who has been in office since 10 January 2022.

Agents of Foreign Affairs (1798–1801)

Secretaries of State of Foreign Affairs (1801–1806)

Ministers of Foreign Affairs (1806–1868)

Ministers of Foreign Affairs (since 1868)

Ministers of Foreign Affairs (since 1918)

List of Ministers without Portfolio

List of State Secretaries for Foreign Affairs

See also
 Ministry of Foreign Affairs
 Minister for Foreign Trade and Development Cooperation

References

Foreign relations of the Netherlands
Foreign Affairs
 
Netherlands diplomacy-related lists
Netherlands politics-related lists